Augustus Clevland (1754–1784) was an East India Company administrator in the Province of Bengal, a Collector of the Revenues and a Judge of the Dewanny Adawlut of the Districts of Bhagalpur and various others. He was very hostile towards the native Indians, after the 1777 famine the natives revolted against the company and he was killed by the rebellion leader Tilka manjhi. He died in mid-career at the early age of 30.

Origins
He was the 6th son of John Clevland (1706-1763) of Tapeley, in the parish of Westleigh, near Bideford, in North Devon, England, his 2nd son by his third wife Sarah Shuckburgh (d.1764), whom he married in 1747, a daughter of Charles Shuckburgh of Longborough, Gloucestershire and a sister of Sir Charles Shuckburgh, 5th Baronet (1722–1773). Clevland is said to have been a cousin of John Shore, 1st Baron Teignmouth, Governor-General of India.

Career
Clevland was an Indian administrator. He was collector and magistrate of Bhagalpur, Bengal, and died in his twenty-ninth year. Two monuments were erected by East India Company; First by Warren Hastings at Calcutta, and the second in the district of Bhagalpur by the company; John Shore wrote a remarkable monody on his early death; and Lord Hastings re-established the school which Cleveland had founded and revived his corps of mountaineers.

Death
He was killed by Tilka Majhi on 12 January 1784, when he was hit by an arrow. At that time Clevland was riding a horse.

Burial
He was buried in South Park Street Cemetery, Kolkata.

Monuments

Structural
Two monuments were erected in his memory: one depicted above built by East India Company and acquaintances, the other in Calcutta (South Park Street Cemetery, plot: 1484),  sent by the Court of Directors of the East India Company from England. The latter comprises a small stone chapel topped by an obelisk, with the following inscription:
"Here lie the Remains of AUGUSTUS CLEVLAND ESQUIRE, Late Collector of the Revenues; Judge of the Dewanny Adawlut of the Districts of BHAUGULPOOR, MOONGYR, RAJEMEHAL, &c&c. He departed this Life 12th of Jany 1784 - at Sea - on Board the Atlas Indiaman, Captain [Allan] Cooper, proceeding to the Cape for the recovery of his Health, aged 29 Years. His Remains, preserved in spirits, were brought up to Town in the Pilot Sloop which attended the Atlas and interred herein, the 30th of the same month. The public and private Virtues of this excellent Young Man, were Singularly eminent. IN HIS PUBLIC CAPACITY, He accomplished, by a System of Conciliation, what could never be effected by Military Coercion. He civilized a Savage Race of Mountaineers who for Ages had existed in a state of Barbarism And eluded every Exertion that had been practised against them To Suppress their Depredations, and reduce them to obedience. To his wise and beneficent Conduct the English East India Company were indebted for the Subjecting to their Government the numerous Inhabitants of that wild & extensive Country - The Jungleterry. IN HIS PRIVATE STATION, By the amiableness of his Deportment, the Gentleness of his manners, And the goodness & generosity of his heart, He was universally admired, beloved & respected by all who had the happiness of knowing him".

Literary

Bishop Heber
Several accounts of Clevland's career exist. One by  Bishop Reginald Heber (1783-1826), Bishop of Calcutta (1823-1826), forms part of his A Journey through the Upper Provinces of India from Calcutta to Bombay 1824-1825 in which he recounts how Clevland had learned the language of the Sonthals, a primitive hill people in Bihar, persuaded them to sell `wax and honey' to the people of the plains, to accept his authority, and submit to his judgment instead of fighting.

Sir John Shore
John Shore, 1st Baron Teignmouth (1751-1834), Governor-General of India 1793-1797 was Clevland's cousin and had been very fond of him. He composed laudatory verse of which the following is part:
"... The savage band
Forsook their haunts and bowed to his Command
And where the warrior's arm in vain assail'd
His gentler skill o'er brutal force prevail'd ...
Now mended morals check the lust for spoil
And rising Hamlets prove his generous toil ..."

Kipling
Rudyard Kipling's story "The Tomb of his Ancestors" (1896) is based on the life story of Clevland, represented by the fictional protagonist "John Chinn".

Paintings by William Hodges
Clevland was a friend and patron of the artist William Hodges (1744-1797), who visited India and accompanied Warren Hastings to Benares in 1781 and on his return in January 1782 stayed for four months as Clevland's guest at Bhagalpur. Together they visited several monuments in the Rajmahal district, as recorded by Hodges in his Travels in India (1793) Hodges describes the journeys he undertook with Cleveland in the Rajmahal district and the various monuments they visited.  In 1794, ten years after Clevland's death, his personal effects were sold, amongst which were  twenty-one works by Hodges, including one entitled Tomb and distant view of Rajmahal Hills, now in the collection of the Tate Gallery. A painting by Hodges titled "A camp of a thousand men formed by Augustus Clevland three miles from Bhagalpur with his mansion in the distance", was sold by his descendant Sir George Christie in 1996 at Christies for £56,500, resold in 2009 for £133,250.

References

1754 births
1784 deaths
Augustus
People from Bideford